The 2016–17 Idaho Vandals men's basketball team represented the University of Idaho during the 2016–17 NCAA Division I men's basketball season. The Vandals, led by ninth-year head coach Don Verlin, played their home games at the Cowan Spectrum, with a few early season games at Memorial Gym, in Moscow, Idaho and were members of the Big Sky Conference. They finished the regular season 19–14, 12–6 in Big Sky play to finish in a tie for third place. Big Sky tournament. They defeated Montana in the quarterfinals of the Big Sky tournament before losing in the semifinals to North Dakota. They were invited to the CollegeInsider.com Tournament where they defeated Stephen F. Austin before losing in the second round to Texas State.

Previous season
The Vandals finished the 2015–16 season 21–13, 12–6 record in Big Sky play to finish in third place. They defeated Eastern Washington in the quarterfinals of the Big Sky tournament to advance to the semifinals where they lost to Montana. They were invited to the College Basketball Invitational where they lost in the first round to Seattle.

Offseason

Departures

Incoming transfers

2016 incoming recruits

Roster

Schedule and results

|-
!colspan=9 style=| Chinese exhibition tour

|-
!colspan=9 style=| Exhibition

|-
!colspan=9 style=| Non-conference regular season

|-
!colspan=9 style=| Big Sky regular season

|-
!colspan=9 style=| Big Sky tournament

|-
!colspan=9 style=| CIT

References

Idaho
Idaho
Idaho Vandals men's basketball seasons
Idaho
Idaho